Margareta Trnková-Hanne also known as Margareta Hanne (born 17 November 1976) is a former Czech deaf female track and field athlete and tennis player. She has represented Czech Republic at the Deaflympics in tennis and athletics sporting events.

Margareta Hanne competed at the Deaflympics in 1993, 1997, 2001, 2005 and 2009. She has claimed four gold medals in her Deaflympic career in the women's 100m and 200m individual events. She was also nominated for the ICSD Deaf Sportswoman of the Year award in 2001 and 2005, mainly for her achievements at the 2001 and 2005 Deaflympic events.

References 

1976 births
Living people
Czech female sprinters
Czech female tennis players
Deaf tennis players
Czech deaf people
Czech people of Slovak descent
Slovak expatriate sportspeople in the Czech Republic
Sportspeople from Trenčín
Deaf competitors in athletics